George Henry Swan (1833 – 25 July 1913) was a 19th-century businessman and Member of Parliament in Hawke's Bay, New Zealand.

Biography

Born in Sunderland, England, Swan went to Australia in 1854 and settled in New Zealand in 1857. Swan served as the Mayor of Napier from 1885 to 1901; at that time, he held the record for holding the longest continuous mayoralty in New Zealand.

Though sometimes described as "Independent", he was really a "conservative"; although those opposed to the Liberals had not yet formed the Reform Party. He was opposed to party government, and wanted Maori and local shipping to pay taxes. 

Swan owned his own brewery. He was initially a photographer by trade.

He died in Whanganui on 25 July 1913. He married an actress, Frances Stopher in 1884. She died in Whanganui in 1939.

References

1833 births
1913 deaths
Members of the New Zealand House of Representatives
Mayors of Napier, New Zealand
New Zealand MPs for North Island electorates
Independent MPs of New Zealand
Unsuccessful candidates in the 1893 New Zealand general election
People from Sunderland
Politicians from Tyne and Wear
English emigrants to New Zealand
New Zealand photographers
Napier City Councillors
19th-century New Zealand politicians